Manon Barbeau  (born 1949) is a Québécois filmmaker, director, writer, and co-founder of Wapikoni Mobile, an organisation that helps First Nations youth learn the art of filmmaking. She has been Wapikoni Mobile’s general director since 2004.

Personal life 

Barbeau was born in Montreal, Quebec, on May 8, 1949.  Her father is painter and sculptor Marcel Barbeau and her mother, Suzanne Meloche, is a poet and painter. She and her partner, cinematographer Philippe Lavalette, have a daughter, Anaïs Barbeau-Lavalette, who is an actor and film director.

While doing research in the archives of the Université de Montréal for her documentary, Les Enfants de Refus global, Barbeau found correspondence detailing her mother’s love affair with Paul-Émile Borduas, the dissolution of her parents’ romantic relationship, as well as evidence that they had abandoned her at the age of three.

Career 

Barbeau graduated in cinema and communications from the Université du Québec à Montréal (UQAM). She has written for TV and, in 1991, published a novel, Merlyne, with Boréal. For over thirty years, Barbeau has been working as a filmmaker, screenwriter and producer for numerous organizations, including Télé-Québec, the National Film Board of Canada, Vidéo Paradiso, La Maison des Cultures Nomades, Totam and Wapikoni Mobile. Barbeau was also president of the Documentary Network (L’Observatoire du Documentaire) from 2006 to 2008.

From 2010 to 2014, she was part of Culture Montréal’s Board of Directors, and in 2014 she was elected president of the organization. She has often spoken publicly about documentary filmmaking and Aboriginal youth at various events and venues including L’Art en Marge, organized by the Institut Universitaire en Santé Mentale de Québec, and at UNESCO for International Women’s Day in 2014.

Wapikoni

Since 2004, Barbeau has been the general director of Wapikoni Mobile, a mobile film studio that travels to remote First Nations communities. The organization has been credited with providing Aboriginal youth with an outlet to express themselves, as well as the tools and skills to do so.

In 2010, UQAM’s faculty of communication and media offered Barbeau an award (Prix Reconnaissance UQAM) for her contributions to documentary filmmaking and her commitment to Aboriginal youth.

Works

Documentaries 
1975: Comptines : Director
1981: Nous sommes plusieur boucoup de monde : Director
1990: Le Marché du couple : Writer
1994: Tristan and Juliette or Love in the Year 2000 (Tristan et Juliette ou l’amour en l’an 2000) : Writer
1996: Les Enfants d’abord : Writer
1997: Raymond Lévesque - d’Amour et d’Amertume : Writer
1998: Les Enfants de Refus global : Director
1999: L'Armée de l'ombre : Director
2000: Barbeau, libre comme l’art : Director
2001: Alain, artiste-démolisseur : Director
2002: La Fin du mépris : Writer
2004: L'Amour en Pen : Director
2004: De mémoire de chats - Les Ruelles : Director
2005: Du bord des bêtes - VLB : Director
2010: Wapikoni - Escale à Kitcisaki : Participant

Films 
1991: Un amour naissant : Writer
2007: Un cri au bonheur : Contributor

Fiction 
1991: Merlyne: Author

Awards 
2003: Won five Prix Gémeaux from the Academy of Canadian Cinema and Television, immortalizing her as one of the academy's "Legends" 
2006: Honoured at the Femmes du Cinéma, de la Télévision et des Nouveaux Médias (FCTNM) Gala for her body of work
2009: Elected as a Canadian Ashoka Fellow for civic engagement
2010: Prix Reconnaissance UQAM for her contributions to documentary filmmaking and her commitment to Aboriginal youth
2012: Nominated for the Prix de la Personalité Internationale de l’Année given by CÉRIUM
2012: Named ‘personality of the week’ by La Presse/Radio-Canada in April
2012: Prix Femmes d'Affaires, OBNL category, from the Réseau des Femmes d’Affaires du Québec
2012: PLURAL+ Honorable Mention Award for Wapikoni Mobile
2012: Telus Community Excellence Award
2014: Elected president of Culture Montreal’s Board of Directors
2014: Officer of the National Order of Quebec
2014: Prix Albert-Tessier
2016: Named a Member of the Order of Canada.

References

External links
 Wapikoni Mobile's website
 

1949 births
Living people
Canadian women film directors
Canadian women screenwriters
French Quebecers
Film directors from Montreal
Writers from Montreal
Université du Québec à Montréal alumni
Canadian documentary film directors
Canadian documentary film producers
Canadian women film producers
Members of the Order of Canada
Officers of the National Order of Quebec
Canadian screenwriters in French
Prix Albert-Tessier winners
Canadian women documentary filmmakers
Ashoka Canada Fellows